Avanà is a red Italian wine grape variety that is grown in the Piedmont wine region of northwest Italy. 

Avana may also refer to:

AVANA (in Malagasy: Antoko ny Vahoaka Aloha No Andrianina), literally the Party Where the People Are the Priority, a Malagasy political party
Avana River, a river of the Cook Islands, which flows in Avana Valley
Avana Petroleum, a company founded in 2007 with assets and activities in Kenya, the Seychelles and wider East Africa/Western Indian Ocean region and purchased eventually by Vanoil Energy

See also
Avana Ivan (English: Is that him?), a 1962 Indian Tamil-language thriller film directed by S. Balachander